Kaz or KAZ may refer to:

Businesses
 KAZ Minerals, a British copper mining company operating in Kazakhstan
 Kaz Incorporated, an American manufacturer and distributor of health care products
 Kaz Records, part of Castle Communication, incorporating Y Records
 Kutaisi Auto Mechanical Plant, a Soviet truck factory in Georgia, formerly Kutaisi Automobile Plant (KAZ)

Entertainment
 Kaz (TV series), CBS
 Kazuhira Miller, a Metal Gear character
 Kaz Proctor, a main character in the television series Wentworth
 Kaz Brekker, a character in Six of Crows
 A character in Shimmer and Shine
 Kaz Harada, a character in the anime Hi Hi Puffy AmiYumi
 Kaz (Dragonlance), a character in Dragonlance and the title character of Kaz the Minotaur, a 1990 novel
 A character in Mighty Med
 Kazuda Xiono, a character in Star Wars Resistance commonly called "Kaz"
 A 2002 FIFA World Cup mascot

People

Given name
 Kaz Garas (born 1940) Lithuanian-born American actor
 Kaz Grala (born 1998), American NASCAR driver
 Kaz Hawkins (born 1973), Northern Irish singer
 Kaz James] (born 1982), Australian singer-songwriter and DJ

Nickname
 Kaz Hayashi (born 1973), Japanese professional wrestler
 Kaz Hirai (born 1960), former chairman of Sony Corporation
 Bill Kazmaier (born 1953), American powerlifter, strongman competitor and professional wrestler
 Kazunori Yamauchi (born 1967), Japanese video game designer and professional racing driver nicknamed "Kaz"
 Nicole Kaczmarski (born 1981), American basketball player

Other
 Kaz (cartoonist), American cartoonist Kazimieras Gediminas Prapuolenis (born 1959)
 Kaz (musician) or K.A.Z., stage name of Japanese musician Kazuhito Iwaike (born 1968)
 a ring name of Frankie Kazarian (born 1977), American professional wrestler

Places
 Kaz, Iran, a village in Kerman Province
 Kaz, Kyrgyzstan
 Kaz, Russia, a locality

Other uses
 KAZ (electric vehicle), a 2003 Japanese prototype
 Kaz II, a yacht found crewless in 2007
 kaz, ISO 630-2 and -3 codes for the Kazakh language

See also
Kas (disambiguation)
KAZZ (disambiguation)

Lists of people by nickname